Lewisia pygmaea is a species of flowering plant in the family Montiaceae known by the common name alpine lewisia and pygmy bitterroot. It is native to western North America from Alaska and Alberta to California and New Mexico, where it grows in many types of moist, rocky mountain habitat, such as gravel beds and sandy meadows.

Description
Lewisia pygmaea is a highly variable species with a wide distribution, and it often hybridizes with other Lewisia species, making identification difficult. In general, this is a petite perennial herb growing from a taproot and caudex unit, and producing a basal rosette of several leaves 2 to 8 centimeters long. The leaves are narrow but thick and fleshy, blunt-tipped, and linear to lance-shaped. The inflorescence is usually made up of a few very short stems each bearing one or more flowers which appear to be sitting on or within the basal leaf rosette. Each flower has 5 to 9 white, pink or red petals which may or may not have dark veining or striping. The petals are 4 millimeters to 1 centimeter long.

Habitat and Range
Lewisia pygmaea grows in open areas with short turf and in gravelly or rocky soils. It can be found naturally growing in  Alta., B.C., Yukon; Ariz., Calif., Colo., Idaho, Mont., Nev., N.Mex., Oreg., Utah, Wash., Wyo.

References

External links
Jepson Manual Treatment
Photo gallery

pygmaea
Flora of the Northwestern United States
Flora of Alaska
Flora of British Columbia
Flora of California
Flora of New Mexico
Flora of the Cascade Range
Flora of the Great Basin
Flora of the Klamath Mountains
Flora of the Rocky Mountains
Flora of the Sierra Nevada (United States)
Natural history of the Transverse Ranges
Flora without expected TNC conservation status